Benthoscolex, is a genus of fireworms belonging to the family Amphinomidae. The genus contains 4 species.

Members of the genus have a flat, fusiform body and lack eyes.

Species
The following species are recognised:
Benthoscolex coecus Horst, 1912 - Red Sea to the South Western Pacific Ocean
 Benthoscolex cubanus Hartman, 1942 - Caribbean Sea
 Benthoscolex microcarunculata (Treadwell, 1901)
 Benthoscolex seisuiae Jimi, Kimura, Ogawa & Kajihara, 2018 - Kumano Sea, Japan

References

Annelids
Annelid genera
Polychaetes